Sociedad Deportiva Gama is a Spanish football team based in Bárcena de Cicero, in the autonomous community of Cantabria. Founded in 1971 it currently plays in Regional Preferente, holding home games at Campo de Fútbol Santa María, which has a capacity of 800 spectators.

Season to season

10 seasons in Tercera División

Honours
Regional Preferente: 1987–88, 2004–05, 2011–12

External links
Official website 
Futbolme team profile 
Arefe Regional team profile 

Football clubs in Cantabria
Association football clubs established in 1971
1971 establishments in Spain